WABL is a classic hits formatted broadcast radio station licensed to Amite, Louisiana, serving Amite and Central Tangipahoa Parish, Louisiana. WABL is owned by Jack Allen, Jr., through licensee Second Line Media, LLC.

Translator

External links

Radio stations in Louisiana
Radio stations established in 1956
1956 establishments in Louisiana